The following is a list of notable halachic rulings by Rabbi Moshe Feinstein, the foremost halachic authority of the late 20th century in the United States; Responsa in Igrot Moshe are cited in parentheses.
Artificial insemination from a non-Jewish donor (EH I:10,71, II:11, IV:32.5)
Ascending the Temple Mount nowadays (OH II:113)
Cosmetic surgery (HM II:66)
Bat Mitzvah for girls (OH I:104 (1956), OH II:97 (1959), OH IV:36)
Brain death as an indication of death under Jewish law. (YD II:146,174, III:132, IV:54) However, this is disputed.
Cholov Yisroel Permitted reliance (at least under extenuating circumstances, such as if no Cholov Yisroel milk is available) on U.S. government agency supervision in ensuring that milk was reliably kosher, and it is as if Jews had personally witnessed it (YD I:47). This was a highly controversial ruling disputed by prominent peers of Feinstein.
Cheating (he forbids it) for the N.Y. Regents exams (HM II:30)
Classical music in religious settings (YD II:111)
Commemorating the Holocaust, Yom ha-Shoah (YD IV:57.11)
Conservative Judaism, including its clergy and schools (e. g., YD II:106–107)
Donating blood for pay (HM I:103)
Education of girls (e. g., YD II:109, YD II:113 YD III:87.2)
End-of-life medical care
Eruv projects in New York City

Hazardous medical operations
Heart transplantation (YD 2:174.3)
Labor union and related employment privileges (e. g., HM I:59)
Mehitza (esp. OH I:39)
Mixed-seating on a subway or other public transportation (EH II:14)
Psychiatric care (YD II:57)
Separation of conjoined twins who were fused all the way from the shoulder to the pelvis and shared one heart. It is during this case that C. Everett Koop, the 13th Surgeon General of the United States, said "The ethics and morals involved in this decision are too complex for me. I believe they are too complex for you as well. Therefore I referred it to an old rabbi on the Lower East Side of New York. He is a great scholar, a saintly individual. He knows how to answer such questions. When he tells me, I too will know."
Shaking hands between men and women (OH I:113; EH I:56; EH IV:32)
Smoking marijuana (YD III:35)
Tay–Sachs disease fetus abortion, esp. in debate with Eliezer Waldenberg
Smoking
Veal raised in factory conditions (EH IV, 92:2)
 Permitted remarriage after Holocaust (EH I:44)

References

Bibliography 

 

Moshe Feinstein
Judaism-related lists
Jewish law
Haredi Judaism in the United States